Rachel Riddell (born September 5, 1984 in Winnipeg, Manitoba) is a Canadian water polo goaltender. She participated at the 2004 Summer Olympics.

Life 
Riddell was a student at Loyola Marymount University, and Concordia University.

She was part of the 4th place women's water polo team at the 2003 world championships in Barcelona, Spain. She was awarded best goalkeeper at the 2003 World Junior Championships in Calgary, Alberta, Canada, when the Canadian team won the gold medal.

Since 2003 Rachel Riddell has been a member of Canada's senior women's water polo team. At the 2005 Fina aquatic games, in Montreal, Canada, she won acclaim for her play in the bronze medal winning game for Canada. In 2006, she helped Canada win silver at the Commonwealth games in Melbourne, Australia.
 
Riddell was awarded best goalkeeper of the 2009 World Championships in Rome, Italy, when Canada won the silver medal.

See also
 Canada women's Olympic water polo team records and statistics
 List of women's Olympic water polo tournament goalkeepers
 List of World Aquatics Championships medalists in water polo

References

External links
 

1984 births
Living people
Sportspeople from Winnipeg
Canadian female water polo players
Water polo goalkeepers
Olympic water polo players of Canada
Water polo players at the 2004 Summer Olympics
Water polo players at the 2007 Pan American Games
Water polo players at the 2011 Pan American Games
World Aquatics Championships medalists in water polo
Pan American Games silver medalists for Canada
Pan American Games medalists in water polo
Medalists at the 2011 Pan American Games
Loyola Marymount University alumni